The following is a list of cases which the government of the United States has filed against individuals that it says have been spying against the United States on behalf of the People's Republic of China  while on American soil.

Accused

Xudong Yao 
Xudong Yao, also known as "William Yao", 57, is  a naturalized United States Citizen wanted for his alleged involvement in the theft of proprietary information from a locomotive manufacturer in Chicago, Illinois. Yao is currently at large and believed to be residing in China. On November 18, 2015, Yao traveled from China to O’Hare International Airport in Chicago. At the time, he had in his possession the stolen trade secret information, including nine complete copies of the suburban Chicago company's control system source code and the systems specifications that explained how the code worked, the federal indictment states. Yao is charged with nine counts of theft of electronic files.

Zhongsan Liu 
On September 16, 2019, Zhongsan Liu was arrested  in Fort Lee, New Jersey by federal agents and charged with conspiracy to commit visa fraud for his involvement in a conspiracy to fraudulently obtain U.S. visas for Chinese government employees. U.S. Attorney Geoffrey S. Berman stated:  "As alleged Zhongsan Liu conspired to obtain research scholar visas fraudulently for people whose actual purpose was not research but recruitment.  Rather than helping to bring students to the U.S., Liu allegedly conspired to defraud this country’s visa system to advance his efforts to attract U.S. experts to China.  Thanks to the Federal Bureau of Investigation (FBI), this alleged abuse of the visa system has been halted."  Liu was released on bail and has not entered a formal plea.

Zaosong Zheng 
In December 2019 Zaosong Zheng, a medical student from China, was arrested at Logan Airport for stealing 21 vials of biological research and attempting to smuggle them out of the United States aboard a flight destined for China. Zheng stated that he intended to bring the vials to China to use them to conduct research in his own laboratory and publish the results under his own name.  Zheng is charged with making false statements, visa fraud, acting as an agent of a foreign government, conspiracy, and smuggling goods from the United States. As of March 2020, Zheng is free on $100,000 bond.

Yanqing Ye 
On January 28, 2020, the FBI issued an arrest warrant for Yanqing Ye on charges of being an agent of a foreign government, visa fraud, making false statements, and conspiracy.  Ye is a Lieutenant of the People's Liberation Army (PLA), the armed forces of the People's Republic of China (PRC) and member of the Chinese Communist Party (CCP). While studying at Boston University's Department of Physics, Chemistry and Biomedical Engineering from October 2017 to April 2019, Ye allegedly continued to work as a PLA Lieutenant completing numerous assignments from PLA officers such as conducting research, assessing United States military websites, and sending United States documents and information to China. Ye is believed to currently be in China.

Charles Lieber 
Charles M. Lieber, the former Chair of Harvard University's Chemistry and Chemical Biology Department, was arrested on January 28, 2020, on charges of making false statements to federal authorities regarding his participation in China's Thousand Talents Program, a program established by the Chinese government to recruit individuals with access to or knowledge of foreign technology and intellectual property.   He was formally indicted in June 2020.  On July 28, 2020, he was also charged with a superseding indictment with tax offenses for failing to report income he received from Wuhan University of Technology (WUT) in Wuhan, China.

Simon Saw-Teong Ang 
On May 8, 2020, Simon Saw-Teong Ang, 63, of Fayetteville, Arkansas, was arrested and charged with wire fraud. Ang allegedly had close ties with the Chinese government and Chinese companies, and failed to disclose those ties when required to do so in order to receive grant money from NASA.

Qing Wang 
On May 14, 2020, Dr. Qing Wang, a former Cleveland Clinic Foundation (CCF) employee,  was arrested and charged with false claims and wire fraud of more than $3.6 million in grant funding he received from the National Institutes of Health (NIH). Dr. Wang is also accused of being part of China's Thousand Talents Program. On July 15, 2021, the federal prosecutors dropped the case "after a review".

Xin Wang, Juan Tang, Chen Song, and Kaikai Zhao 
Four Chinese nationals have been charged with visa fraud. On June 7, 2020, Xin Wang was arrested at the Los Angeles International Airport and charged with visa fraud.  Wang, a scientific researcher at the University of California, San Francisco (UCSF) and officer with the People's Republic of China's (PRC) People's Liberation Army (PLA), is charged with falsifying his U.S. visa application and accused of stealing secrets from the medical researchers and sending them to a military lab in China. Chen Song and  Kaikai Zhao were both arrested in July 2020 for lying on their visa applications to conceal their affiliation with the PLA. The FBI sought to arrest Juan Tang pursuant to an Arrest Warrant and Complaint that were filed on June 26, and unsealed on July 20. In a rare move, Tang sought refuge at the Chinese consulate in San Francisco, where the Chinese government sheltered her for several weeks until she eventually left the consulate to attend a medical appointment and was arrested.

Li Xiaoyu and Dong Jiazhi 
On July 21, 2020, Li Xiaoyu and Dong Jiazhi were charged with hacking into the computer systems of hundreds of companies, governments, non-governmental organizations, and individual dissidents, clergy, and democratic and human rights activists in the United States and abroad.   The defendants had recently probed for vulnerabilities in computer networks of companies developing COVID-19 vaccines, testing technology, and treatments.

Alexander Yuk Ching Ma 
In August 2020 the FBI arrested 67-year-old former Central Intelligence Agency (CIA) officer Alexander Yuk Ching Ma over allegations that Ma had given classified material to Chinese handlers in exchange for cash and gifts.

Zhengdong Cheng 
On August 23, 2020, Zhengdong Cheng, a NASA Researcher and Texas A&M University professor was arrested for making false statements and wire fraud in relation to China's Talents Program. On September 22, 2022, Cheng pleaded guilty to two charges: violation of NASA regulations and falsifying official documents.

Guan Lei 
Chinese national Guan Lei, 29, of Alhambra, was charged with destroying a hard drive during an FBI investigation into the possible transfer of sensitive software to China on August 28, 2020.

Zhang Haoran, Tan Dailin, Jiang Lizhi, Qian Chuan, and Fu Qiang 
On September 16, 2020, The U.S. Department of Justice charged Chinese hackers Zhang Haoran, Tan Dailin, Jiang Lizhi, Qian Chuan, and Fu Qiang with breaching more than 100 companies, think tanks, universities and government agencies around the world. A total of 7 hackers have been charged.

Mingqing Xiao 
On April 21, 2021, Mingqing Xiao, 59, a mathematics professor and researcher at Southern Illinois University, was charged with two counts of wire fraud and one count of making a false statement.  Xiao allegedly fraudulently obtained $151,099 in federal grant money from the National Science Foundation (NSF) by concealing support he was receiving from the Chinese government and a Chinese university.

Convicted of Espionage

Larry Wu-tai Chin 
Larry Wu-tai Chin worked in the U.S. intelligence community for nearly 35 years while providing China with classified information.
Chin was recruited as a spy by a CCP official when he started working as a translator for the Americans in Fuzhou in 1944; in 1948 he started as an interpreter at the U.S. consulate in Shanghai then later Korea; in 1952 he was hired by the CIA's Foreign Broadcast Information Service, who transferred him to California in 1961. After he became an American citizen in 1965 he was transferred to Arlington, Virginia, where he had access to reports from intelligence agents abroad and translations of documents acquired by CIA officers in China. He met his case officer, Ou Qiming, on visits to Hong Kong from the 1950s onwards, and had a New York emergency contact in the 1970s: Father Mark Cheung at the Church of the Transfiguration in Chinatown, whom the MSS had sent to a Catholic seminary in order to infiltrate the Catholic Church, despite having a wife in China. Chin sold classified National Intelligence Estimates pertaining to China and Southeast Asia to China,
enabling China to discover weaknesses in its intelligence agencies and compromise U.S. intelligence activities in the region. He betrayed Chinese POWs whom he had interviewed in Korea, believed to have been executed or incarcerated on their return to China. He provided sensitive information about Richard Nixon's plans for normalizing relations with China two years before the president visited the country. 
Upon retirement in 1981 aged 59, Chin was awarded a Career Intelligence Medal by the CIA then a week later flew to Hong Kong to be paid a retirement bonus by the MSS. His MSS earnings had mostly been invested in property—he owned 31 properties in the Washington DC area alone.
He was arrested in 1985 after 3 years' information-assembling by the FBI of multiple defectors' information. In February 1986, Chin was convicted of 17 counts of espionage, conspiracy, and tax evasion, including 2 life terms, but committed suicide before he could be sentenced.

Glenn Duffie Shriver 
Glenn Duffie Shriver was born November 23, 1981, in Henrico County, Virginia. He attended Grand Valley State University (GVSU) in Allendale, Michigan. In 2001, he took part in a 45-day summer study program in Shanghai, China. He subsequently spent his junior year at East China Normal University, also in Shanghai. After graduating from GVSU in 2004 with a bachelor's in international relations, Shriver returned to Shanghai to work and to study the Chinese language, in which he eventually became proficient. He had a few acting jobs in the Chinese film industry.

In about 2004, Shriver answered an ad to write a paper about U.S.–China relations with regard to Taiwan and North Korea. A Chinese woman calling herself "Amanda" praised his paper and paid him US$120. This was a type of low-key initial approach, common while recruiting intelligence operatives. Amanda eventually introduced Shriver to a "Mr. Wu" and "Mr. Wang". Amanda, Wu, and Wang, all operatives of the Chinese Ministry of State Security, encouraged him to apply for jobs with the United States government or law enforcement, rather than the more common approach of recruiting an existing agent.

Soon they told him they were interested in obtaining classified material, and paid him $10,000 to take the United States Foreign Service Exam in Shanghai in 2005, though he failed to pass. He was paid $20,000 for a second attempt at the exam in 2006 which he also failed. Shriver next applied for a position as a clandestine officer with the National Clandestine Service branch of the CIA in 2007. This time he requested and received payment of $40,000 from the Chinese. He took the money to the United States, but failed to report it, as required by law.

In June 2010 Shriver was arrested while trying to depart Detroit Metropolitan Wayne County Airport for South Korea and charged with five counts of "making false statements" and one count of "willfully conspiring to provide national defense information to intelligence officers of the PRC". He was denied bail and prosecuted by Stephen M. Campbell, a United States attorney in Alexandria, Virginia.

Shriver was facing up to 10 years in prison under Section 793, but the prosecutor had also threatened him with a prosecution under Section 794 which had a maximum of life imprisonment. Shriver pleaded guilty in October 2010 to one count of conspiracy to commit unlawful conveyance of national defense information as part of a plea bargain which included a full debriefing and polygraph testing. On January 21, 2011, he was sentenced to four years in prison by judge Liam O'Grady. Shriver had met with his handlers about 20 times, most often "Amanda", and taken in $70,000. Shriver said "I made a terrible decision. Somewhere along the way I got into bed with the wrong people. I cannot tell you what it's like to carry a dark secret like this for so many years." Professor Geling Shang, one of the leaders of Shriver's summer study group, had worried that Shriver had no sense of what he wanted to do with his life. Shriver stated that he had been motivated by greed. He served his sentence at the Federal Correctional Institution near Elkton, Ohio. Shriver was released from federal prison in late 2013.

Shriver's experience was dramatized in the short film Game of Pawns, produced by the Counter-Intelligence Unit of the FBI and released online in April 2014. One of the film's goals was to warn students of dangers in China. It featured the actor Joshua Murray as Shriver.

Peter Lee 
Peter Lee, a physicist born in China who worked at the Los Alamos National Laboratory and later for TRW Inc., pleaded guilty to lying on security-clearance forms and passing classified national-defense information to Chinese scientists on business trips to Beijing.
He compromised classified weapons information, microwave submarine-detection technology and other national-defense data,
and the Department of Energy later concluded that his disclosure of classified information "was of significant material assistance to the PRC in their nuclear weapons development program ... This analysis indicated that Dr. Lee's activities have directly enhanced the PRC nuclear weapons program to the detriment of U.S. national security."

Chi Mak 
Chi Mak is a Chinese-born engineer who worked for L-3 Communications, a California-based defense contractor,
as a support engineer on Navy quiet-drive propulsion technology.
According to recovered documents, he was instructed by his Chinese contacts to join "more professional associations and participate in more seminars with 'special subject matters' and to compile special conference materials on disk".
He was instructed to gather information on space-based electromagnetic intercept systems, space-launched magnetic-levitation platforms, electromagnetic gun or artillery systems, submarine torpedoes, electromagnetic launch systems, aircraft carrier electronic systems, water-jet propulsion, ship submarine propulsion, power-system configuration technology, weapons-system modularization, technologies to defend against nuclear attack, shipboard electromagnetic motor systems, shipboard internal and external communications systems and information on the next generation of U.S. destroyers.
He copied and sent sensitive documents on U.S. Navy ships, submarines and weapons to China by courier. In 2008, he was sentenced to a -year prison term for espionage.

Moo Ko-Suen 
In May 2006,  Ko-Suen "Bill" Moo  pleaded guilty to being a covert agent of China. Moo attempted to purchase United States military equipment to send to China when he was arrested by undercover United States agents. Some of the equipment included an F-16 fighter jet engine, an AGM-129A cruise missile, UH-60 Black Hawk helicopter engines and AIM-120 air-to-air missiles.

Fei Ye and Ming Zhong
Fei Ye, a U.S. citizen; and Ming Zhong, a permanent resident of the United States; were arrested at the San Francisco International Airport on November 23, 2001. They were accused of stealing trade secrets in designing a computer microprocessor to benefit China, although prosecutors did not allege that the Chinese government knew of their activities. In December 2002, they were charged with a total of ten counts, including conspiracy; economic espionage; possession of stolen trade secrets; and foreign transportation of stolen property. In 2006 (five years after their arrest), they pleaded guilty to two counts each of economic espionage. In 2008, they were sentenced to a year in prison. The maximum sentence is 30 years however prosecutors asked for less because of their cooperation. The case resulted in the first convictions under the Economic Espionage Act of 1996.

Gregg Bergersen and Tai Shen Kuo 
In 2008, Gregg William Bergersen was a weapons systems policy analyst for the United States Defense Security Cooperation Agency. A director of C4ISR programs, he was found guilty of spying for the People's Republic of China. A resident of Alexandria, Virginia, he sold classified defense information to Tai Kuo, a naturalized citizen originally from Taiwan, who was a New Orleans furniture salesman. Kuo convinced Bergersen that the information would be given to Taiwan, but then forwarded the information to the PRC government.  Kuo allegedly handed the information to Yu Xin Kang, a lawful resident alien also living in New Orleans. Kang in turn allegedly gave the information to a spy for the Chinese government. Bergersen was sentenced to 57 months in prison and Kuo received 16 years in prison.

Anne Lockwood, Michael Haehnel, and Fuping Liu 
In February 2009, three former employees of Metaldyne Corporation were sentenced to prison terms in federal court in connection with a conspiracy to steal confidential information from the company, according to Acting United States Attorney Terrence Berg. Anne Lockwood, formerly a vice president for Sales at Metaldyne, her husband Michael Haehnel, formerly a senior engineer at Metaldyne, and Fuping Liu, a former metallurgist for Metaldyne.
Lockwood and Liu both pleaded guilty on September 15, 2008, to the main count of the indictment, conspiracy to steal confidential and proprietary information belonging to Metaldyne, and using the stolen information in order to assist a Chinese competitor, the Chongqing Huafu Industry Company ("Huafu"), of Chongqing, China to compete against Metaldyne in the field of powdered metal parts. Haehnel pleaded guilty to a misdemeanor offense charging him with unlawfully accessing stored electronic records.
Beginning in May 2004, Lockwood and Liu developed a business plan to help Huafu compete against Metaldyne in the production of powdered metal products. Lockwood obtained both electronic and paper copies of confidential and proprietary information pertaining to Metaldyne's internal costs and its manufacturing processes, and then provided some of that information to Huafu, in China, to assist it in competing against Metaldyne. Lockwood received 30 months in prison, Haehnel received six months in prison, and Liu received nine months.

James Reece Roth 
John Reece Roth, professor emeritus of electrical and computer engineering, was convicted on September 3, 2008, of one count of conspiring with Atmospheric Glow Technology Inc., a Knoxville technology company, to unlawfully export in 2005 and 2006 fifteen different "defense articles" to a citizen of the People's Republic of China in violation of the Arms Export Control Act. He was also convicted of fifteen counts of violating the Arms Export Control Act and one count of wire fraud relating to exporting sensitive military information relating to an air force contract and depriving the university of his "honest services."  On July 9, 2009, at age 72, he was sentenced to four years in prison and two years of supervised release after completion of the prison term. Between 2005 and 2006, Roth, an electrical engineering professor at the University of Tennessee (UT), and an employee of a Knoxville-based company known as Atmospheric Glow Technologies (AGT), Inc., knowingly provided export-controlled defense information to a Chinese graduate student on his research team. Roth also travelled to China with export-controlled documents. On one occasion, Roth asked the Chinese graduate student to email export-controlled material to a Chinese professor Roth visited.

It was alleged Roth disclosed technical data including fifteen different defense articles provided to a citizen of the People's Republic of China in violation of the Arms Export Control Act. The defense articles contained specific military technical data that was restricted and was associated with the Air Force project to develop plasma technology for use on weapons system drones.

Bryan Underwood 
Bryan Underwood, a former civilian guard at a U.S. Consulate compound under construction in Guangzhou China, was sentenced on March 5, 2013, to nine years in prison in connection with his efforts to sell for personal financial gain classified photographs, information, and access related to the U.S. Consulate to China's Ministry of State Security (MSS).

Hua Jun Zhao 
Hua Jun Zhao, 42, was accused of stealing a cancer-research compound from a Medical College of Wisconsin office in Milwaukee in an attempt to deliver it to Zhejiang University, according to an FBI agent's March 29, 2013, affidavit.
Presiding judge Charles N. Clevert found no evidence that "Zhao had intended to defraud or cause any loss to Medical College of Wisconsin, or even to make money for himself".
Zhao was convicted for "accessing a computer without authorization and obtaining information worth more than $5,000" for accessing his research on university-owned computers after school officials seized his own laptop, portable memory devices and papers.

Walter Liew 
In July 2014, Walter Lian-Heen Liew (aka Liu Yuanxuan) was sentenced to serve 15 years in prison for violations of the Economic Espionage Act, tax evasion, bankruptcy fraud, and obstruction of justice. Liew was convicted in March 2014 on each of the twenty counts charged. His company was found by the jury to steal trade secrets from E.I. du Pont de Nemours & Company to state-owned companies of China, Pangang Group companies.

Szuhsiung Ho 
Szuhsiung Ho, aka Allen Ho, 66, a naturalized U.S. citizen, pleaded guilty to conspiracy to unlawfully engage or participate in the production or development of special nuclear material outside the U.S., without the required authorization from the U.S. Department of Energy (DOE) in violation of the Atomic Energy Act.
In April 2016, a federal grand jury issued a two-count indictment against Ho; China General Nuclear Power Company (CGNPC), the largest nuclear power company in China, and Energy Technology International (ETI), a Delaware corporation. At the time of the indictment Ho was a nuclear engineer, employed as a consultant by CGNPC and was also the owner of ETI. CGNPC specialized in the development and manufacture of nuclear reactors and was controlled by China's State-Owned Assets Supervision and Administration Commission. Born in China, Ho is a naturalized U.S. citizen with dual residency in Delaware and China.

Kun Shan Chun
In January 2017, Preet Bharara, the United States Attorney for the Southern District of New York, Mary B. McCord, Acting Assistant Attorney General for National Security, and William F. Sweeney Jr., Assistant Director-in-Charge of the New York Field Office of the Federal Bureau of Investigation ("FBI"), announced that Kun Shan Chun, a/k/a "Joey Chun," was sentenced to serve 24 months in prison and pay a $10,000 fine based on his conviction for acting in the United States as an agent of the People's Republic of China ("China"), without providing prior notice to the Attorney General. Chun pled guilty on August 1, 2016.
U.S. District Judge Victor Marrero imposed Chun's sentence. Kun Shan Chun, a native of China and naturalized U.S. citizen, worked as an FBI technician since 1997 and had top secret clearance.

Candace Marie Claiborne 
On March 28, 2017, The F.B.I. arrested Candace Marie Claiborne, of the U.S. State Department.  She allegedly "failed to report her contacts with Chinese foreign intelligence agents who provided her with thousands of dollars of gifts and benefits", said Acting Assistant Attorney General McCord. "Claiborne used her position and her access to sensitive diplomatic data for personal profit. Pursuing those who imperil our national security for personal gain will remain a key priority of the National Security Division." On April 24, 2019, Candace Claiborne pleaded guilty to a charge of conspiracy to defraud the United States, by lying to law enforcement and background investigators, and hiding her extensive contacts with, and gifts from, agents of the People's Republic of China (PRC), in exchange for providing them with internal documents from the U.S. State Department.  The statutory maximum penalty for a person convicted of conspiracy to defraud the United States is five years in prison. On July 9, 2019, Claiborne was sentenced to 40 months in prison followed by three years of supervised release and a fine of $40,000.

Kevin Mallory 
In June 2017, Kevin Patrick Mallory was arrested and charged under the Espionage Act on charges of performing espionage on behalf of the Chinese government.
Mallory was given special communications devices for communicating documents to Chinese intelligence agents, including documents classified as top secret.
The individuals alleged to be working for China's intelligence services represented themselves as working for the Shanghai Academy of Social Sciences.
Some of the material in his possession is alleged to contain sensitive information on human intelligence sources.

Mallory graduated from Brigham Young University in 1981, and resided in Leesburg, Virginia.
Prior to his arrest, Mallory had served in the United States Army and worked as a Special Agent for the Diplomatic Security Service from 1987 to 1990.
Mallory worked for the Defense Intelligence Agency at some point in his career.
He was a self-employed consultant for GlobalEx, LLC.
Mallory had previously worked for the CIA (as a case officer between 1990 and 1996, and as a contractor between 2010 and 2012) and at the American Institute in Taiwan.

On July 7, 2017, during preliminary court proceedings, U.S. District Judge T. S. Ellis III ordered Mallory's bond revoked, judging him to be a flight risk and a potential threat to national security. The FBI cracked his cell phone and retrieved eight documents, some of which were top secret. In a call to his son, he had attempted to arrange to secrete case evidence in his home.
Mallory was convicted on June 8, 2018, of four charges: conspiracy to deliver, attempted delivery, delivery of defense information to aid a foreign government, and making material false statements. He was sentenced to 20 years in May 2019.

Jerry Chun Shing Lee 
In January 2018, the F.B.I. arrested former C.I.A. officer Jerry Chun Shing Lee, charging him with unlawful possession of defense information. He may have compromised the identities of numerous CIA spies in China.
Jerry Chun Shing Lee, a naturalized U.S. citizen, had worked for the CIA with a top-secret security clearance from 1994 until 2007. Several years after his departure from the CIA, China began capturing and killing U.S. informants. Officials in the U.S. began investigating whether a mole was responsible for outing the identities of sources working with the U.S. In May 2018, Lee was formally charged with conspiracy to commit espionage on behalf of China.
According to the indictment, he met two intelligence officers from China's Ministry of State Security in Shenzhen, a city bordering Hong Kong, in April 2010, and they gave him "a gift of $100,000 cash in exchange for his cooperation", with the promise that "they would take care of him for life".
Lee received hundreds of thousands of dollars in cash that he deposited into his HSBC bank accounts in Hong Kong between 2010 and 2013, the same time the CIA lost 18 to 20 Chinese informants who were killed or imprisoned for providing sensitive information to the U.S. government.
Lee started working for a cigarette company in Hong Kong in 2007, the same year he left the CIA. In 2009, Japan Tobacco International terminated his contract amid suspicions that he was leaking sensitive information about its operations to Chinese authorities. He then set up his own company, also related to the import of cigarettes, which did not succeed. According to court papers, Lee's business partner in Hong Kong arranged meetings and passed messages from Chinese intelligence officers to him. From June 2013 to September 2015, the former CIA agent worked for the cosmetics company Estée Lauder. At the time of his arrest, he was the head of security at the international auction house Christie's in Hong Kong. He has pled guilty.

Xu Jiaqiang 
Xu Jiaqiang pleaded guilty to charges of economic espionage, theft, and possession and distribution of trade secrets, after having been accused of stealing the source code to IBM software, with the intention of benefiting the National Health and Family Planning Commission.
On January 18, 2018, Xu was sentenced to five years in prison by District Judge Kenneth M. Karas.
Xu previously pled guilty to all six counts with which he was charged.

Ron Rockwell Hansen 
On June 4, 2018, Ron Rockwell Hansen, a U.S. Army veteran and former Defense Intelligence Agency (DIA) officer, was arrested on federal charges including the attempted transmission of national defense information to the People's Republic of China. The FBI agents took Hansen into custody while he was on his way to Seattle-Tacoma International Airport in Seattle to board a connecting flight to China.

Hansen is charged with attempted espionage, acting as an unregistered foreign agent for China, bulk cash smuggling, structuring monetary transactions, and smuggling goods from the United States. If convicted, Hansen faces a maximum penalty of life in prison.  On March 15, 2019, Hansen pleaded guilty in the District of Utah in connection with his attempted transmission of national defense information to the People's Republic of China.  On September 26, 2019, Hansen was sentenced to 10 years in federal prison.

Yi-Chi Shih 
Yi-Chi Shih, an electrical engineer and a University of California, Los Angeles professor, was found guilty in June 2019 by a Los Angeles jury on 18 counts related to smuggling computer chips containing military secrets to China.

Hongjin Tan 
Following his December 2018 arrest, Hongjin Tan pleaded guilty in November 2019, and was sentenced in February 2020 for stealing proprietary information worth more than $1 billion from his employer, a U.S. petroleum company where he was employed from June 2017 until December 2018 as an associate scientist.

Xuehua Edward Peng 
On September 30, 2019, the FBI arrested Xuehua Peng, also known as Edward Peng, 56, for acting as an illegal foreign agent in delivering classified United States national security information to officials of the People's Republic of China's Ministry of State Security (MSS). Mr Peng, 56, of Hayward, California, was caught on FBI surveillance video completing a "dead drop" in a Northern California hotel room, and allegedly completed five more dead drops between 2015 and 2018. He was arrested on September 27, 2019, at his residence in Hayward, California, and denied bail at a court hearing. On March 16, 2020, Peng was sentenced to 48 months in prison, and ordered to pay a $30,000 fine.

Xiao-Jiang Li 
Former Emory University professor Dr. Xiao-Jiang Li was convicted of filing a false tax return on May 8, 2020.  Dr. Li, a former Emory University professor and Chinese Thousand Talents Program participant, worked overseas at Chinese universities and did not report any of his foreign income on his federal tax returns.  Li was sentenced to one year of probation on a felony charge and was ordered to pay restitution in the amount of $35,089.

Yeo Jun Wei 
Yeo Jun Wei, also known as Dickson Yeo, a Singaporean national, pled guilty on July 24, 2020, to acting in the United States as an illegal agent of Chinese intelligence. Yeo admitted to setting up a fake consulting company to target U.S. government employees and an Army officer to obtain information for the government of China.

Li Chen 
In July 2019,  federal agents arrested husband and wife couple Yu Zhou, 49, and Li Chen, 46, currently of San Diego, California, for stealing medical secrets from the former employer.  The couple conspired to, attempted to and did steal scientific trade secrets related to exosomes and exosome isolation from Nationwide Children's Hospital's Research Institute for their own personal financial gain.  The husband and wife allegedly founded a company in China in 2015 without the hospital's knowledge.  While Zhou and Chen continued to be employed by Nationwide Children's, they marketed products and services related to exosome isolation through their Chinese company.  In September 2019,  they were charged with crimes related to stealing exosome-related trade secrets concerning the research, identification and treatment of a range of pediatric medical conditions. On July 30, 2020, Li Chen pled guilty.  On February 1, 2021, Chen was sentenced to 30 months in prison for conspiring to steal exosome-related trade secrets concerning the research, identification and treatment of a range of pediatric medical conditions.  Chen also conspired to commit wire fraud.

Hao Zhang 
On June 26, 2020, Hao Zhang, 41, of China, was found guilty of economic espionage, theft of trade secrets, and conspiring to commit both offenses.  Zhang conspired to and did steal trade secrets from two U.S. electronics companies: Avago and Skyworks. Zhang intended to steal the trade secrets for the benefit of the People's Republic of China.

Turab Lookman 
On September 15, 2020, Turab Lookman, 68, of Santa Fe, New Mexico, was sentenced to five years of probation and a $75,000 fine for providing a false statement to the Department of Energy about being employed by China.

Yang Yang 
On September 16, 2020, Jacksonville, Florida, resident Yang Yang pled guilty to attempting to illegally export maritime raiding craft and engines to China. She faces a maximum of 15 years in prison.

Wei Sun 
On November 28, 2020, Wei Sun, a 49 year old Chinese national and former Raytheon engineer, was sentenced to 38 months in prison after pleading guilty to one felony count of violating the Arms Export Control Act (AECA).  Sun was employed in Tucson, Arizona, for 10 years as an electrical engineer with Raytheon Missiles and Defense where he had access to classified national defense information.  From December 2018 to January 2019, Sun traveled from the United States to China on a personal trip and transmitted sensitive military related technology to China.

Shuren Qin 
In June 2018, Qin was arrested on accusations that he shipped 78 hydrophones for use in anti-submarine warfare to the Northwestern Polytechnical University, which is affiliated with the People's Liberation Army.  In April 2021, Qin pleaded guilty in federal court in Boston in connection with illegally procuring and causing the illegal export of $100,000 worth of U.S. origin goods to Northwestern Polytechnical University (NWPU), a Chinese military university that is heavily involved in military research and works closely with the People's Liberation Army on the advancement of its military capabilities.

Song Guo Zheng 
In May 2021, Dr. Song Guo Zheng, an Ohio resident and rheumatology professor/researcher with "strong ties to China" was sentenced to 37 months in prison and ordered to pay over $3.8 million in restitution to the NIH and Ohio State University (at which Zheng formerly led a research team) after being convicted of making false statements to federal authorities regarding his ties to China. He had, before his sentencing, pleaded guilty to lying on NIH grant applications to spend funds helping develop China's immunology and rheumatology expertise. Zheng had lied about and hidden his connection to China's Thousand Talents Plan, which the FBI described as "a program established by the Chinese government to recruit individuals with knowledge or access to foreign technology intellectual property."

Yanjun Xu 
Yanjun Xu, also known as Qu Hui and Zhang Hui, was convicted in 2021 and sentenced to 20 years in prison. In October 2018 Xu was charged with conspiring and attempting to commit economic espionage and steal trade secrets from multiple U.S. aviation and aerospace companies.
Xu was arrested in Belgium in April 2018 following the filing of a criminal complaint against him in Cincinnati.
The United States alleged that Xu is a deputy division director for the Ministry of State Security, and that Xu was engaged in espionage against GE Aviation.
Xu, a senior officer with China's Ministry of State Security (MSS), is accused of seeking to steal trade secrets from leading aviation firms, top Justice Department officials said.  Xu recruited experts to travel to China, often under the guise of asking them to deliver a university presentation and passing himself off as an official with the Jiangsu Science and Technology Promotion Association. Xu often exchanged information with individuals at Nanjing University of Aeronautics and Astronautics, one of the top engineering schools in China, which has significant influence over the country's aerospace industry, according to court documents.

Yanjun Xu, the first Chinese operative extradited to the United States for trial, was convicted in November 2021 of two counts of conspiring and attempting to commit economic espionage, in addition to a count of conspiracy to commit trade secret theft and two counts of attempted theft of trade secrets. Xu was sentenced to 20 years in prison.

Xiang Haitao 
Xiang Haitao plead guilty in early 2022 to stealing proprietary software developed by Monsanto to help farmers improve crop yields.

Shapour Moinian 
On June 23, 2022, Shapour Moinian, 67, of San Diego, CA, pleaded guilty to lying on his SF-86 security clearance forms and to being a paid unregistered agent of the government of China. Moinian is a former U.S. Army helicopter pilot who accepted thousands of dollars from representatives of the Chinese government to provide aviation-related information from his defense-contractor employers. At sentencing, Moinian faces a maximum penalty of 10 years in prison and fine up to $250,000 for acting as an agent of a foreign government, and up to five years and a $250,000 fine for the false statements count. Sentencing is scheduled for August 29.

Ji Chaoqun 
Ji Chaoqun, 27, a Chinese citizen residing in Chicago, was arrested in Chicago on September 25, 2018, for allegedly acting within the United States as an illegal agent of the People's Republic of China. Ji, who had been recruited by Yanjun Xu, worked at the direction of a high-level intelligence officer in Jiangsu State Security Department (JSSD) of the Ministry of State Security (MSS) for the People's Republic of China, according to a criminal complaint and affidavit filed in U.S. District Court in Chicago. Ji was tasked with providing the intelligence officer with biographical information on eight individuals for possible recruitment by the JSSD, the complaint states. The individuals included Chinese nationals who were working as engineers and scientists in the United States, some of whom were U.S. defense contractors, according to the complaint. He was formally indicted on January 24, 2019. Ji had enlisted in the U.S. Army Reserves through the Military Accessions Vital to the National Interest (MAVNI) program.

Ji was convicted in 2022 of spying, conspiracy to act as an agent of China's Ministry of State Security without notifying the U.S. Attorney General, and lying on a government form about his contacts with foreign agencies. He was acquitted on two charges of wire fraud, related to enlisting in the U.S. Army Reserves. In late January 2023, Ji was sentenced to 8 years in jail.

Convicted of other crimes

Bo Jiang 
Bo Jiang, a researcher working on "source code for high technology imaging" at NASA's Langley Research Center, was arrested for lying to a federal officer on March 16, 2013, at Washington Dulles International Airport before returning to China. Jiang allegedly told the FBI that he was carrying fewer computer storage devices than he was. He was accused of espionage by Representative Frank Wolf, and was investigated for possible violations of the Arms Export Control Act.
An affidavit said that Jiang had previously brought a NASA laptop with sensitive information to China.
U.S. Magistrate Judge Lawrence Leonard ordered Jiang released after a federal prosecutor acknowledged that there was no evidence that he possessed sensitive, secret or classified material.
According to Jiang's lawyer, Fernando Groene – a former federal prosecutor who practices out of Williamsburg, Wolf made a "scapegoat" of his client.
On May 2, Jiang was cleared in federal court of the felony charge of lying to federal investigators.
Jiang was nevertheless convicted for downloading copyrighted movies, television shows and sexually explicit images on the NASA-owned laptop.

Exonerated

Baimadajie Angwang 
On September 21, 2020, U.S. federal prosecutors charged New York City police officer Baimadajie Angwang with acting as an illegal agent of the Chinese government, accusing him of providing intelligence about Tibetans living in the United States to two MSS officials at the Chinese consulate. Angwang was born in the Tibet region of China and is a naturalized US citizen.  Angwang is also employed by the US Army Reserve. His father is a retired member of China's army and a member of the CCP. His mother is also a member of the party and a former government official.  Angwang allegedly provided the consulate with access to senior NYPD officials through invitations to official events.

In January 2023, federal prosecutors moved to dismiss charges against Angwang. Angwang told the Associated Press that he had been speaking with Chinese officials so he could get a visa to return to Tibet, hoping to introduce his daughter to his parents.

Gang Chen 
In January 2021, Gang Chen, a Massachusetts Institute of Technology (MIT) professor, was indicted by a federal grand jury in connection with failing to disclose contracts, appointments, and awards from various entities in the People's Republic of China (PRC) to the U.S. Department of Energy. Gang Chen, 56, was indicted on two counts of wire fraud, one count of failing to file a foreign bank account report (FBAR) and one count of making a false statement in a tax return.  Chen is a naturalized U.S. citizen who was born in China. He is a professor and researcher at MIT.  Since 2012, Chen has allegedly held various appointments with the PRC designed to promote the PRC's technological and scientific development by providing advice and expertise – sometimes directly to PRC government officials – and often in exchange for financial compensation. On January 14, 2022, prosecutors recommended the charges against Chen based on "new information". On January 20, 2022, federal prosecutors dropped all charges against Chen. Officials from the Department of Energy told prosecutors that they likely still would have given Chen the grants even if he had disclosed ties to China.

Sherry Chen 
Xiafen "Sherry" Chen, 59, was a hydrologist for the federal government in Ohio. She was falsely accused of spying and arrested in October 2014. She was originally charged with four felonies, including that she had illegally downloaded data about national infrastructure and made false statement of telling federal agents that she last seen a Chinese official in 2011, not 2012. Five months later (in March 2015), persuaded by a lawyer, Peter R. Zeidenberg, a partner at Arent Fox in Washington, prosecutors dropped all charges against Mrs. Chen without explanation. On April 23, 2018, Chief Administrative Judge Michele Szary Schroeder ordered the U.S. Department of Commerce to reinstate Chen's employment, citing "gross injustice" in her case.

Guoqing Cao and Shuyu Li 
Two former Eli Lilly and Co. employees, Guoqing Cao and Shuyu Li, were arrested in October 2013 under the charges of theft and conspiracy to commit theft involving drugs that Lilly was developing. The indictment alleged Cao and Li emailed sensitive experimental drug information worth $55 million to a competing Chinese drug company. U.S. Attorney Joe Hogsett and his deputy, Cynthia Ridgeway characterized the case as "a crime against the nation" and called the defendants as "traitors". In December 2014, the U.S. attorney's office dropped charges "in the interests of justice".

Anming Hu 

Anming Hu, a Chinese-Canadian associate professor in the Department of Mechanical, Aerospace and Biomedical Engineering at the University of Tennessee, Knoxville (UTK) was arrested on February 27, 2020. Hu was charged with three counts of wire fraud and three counts of making false statements after 21 months of FBI surveillance failed to turn up evidence of espionage. Federal prosecutors alleged that Hu committed fraud by hiding his relationship with a Chinese university while receiving funding from NASA.

In June 2021, an FBI agent at Hu's trial stated that he falsely accused Hu of being a spy, baselessly implicated him as a Chinese military agent to UTK, and used false information to put him on the Federal No Fly List. The agent also stated he attempted to have Hu spy for the United States. Hu's trial for fraud ended on June 16, 2021, in a mistrial. Afterward, a juror characterized the trial as "the most ridiculous case" and the charges against Hu as "a series of plausible errors, a lack of support from UT, and ruthless ambition on behalf of the FBI." The day after the end of the trial, Democratic Representatives Ted Lieu, Mondaire Jones, and Pramila Jayapal voiced concerns about Hu's prosecution and called on Justice Department Inspector General Michael E. Horowitz to investigate allegations of FBI misconduct.

The government attempted to try Anming Hu a second time. In September, 2021 a judge acquitted him on all charges, writing "[E]ven viewing all the evidence in the light most favorable to the government, no rational jury could conclude that defendant acted with a scheme to defraud NASA".

Lan Lee and Yuefei Ge 
In 2007, two Silicon Valley engineers, Lan Lee and Yuefei Ge, were charged with economic espionage for stealing microchip designs from NetLogic Microsystems, for the benefit of the Chinese military, the People's Liberation Army.
Their indictment stated that the two formed a company named SICO Microsystems Inc. to facilitate the alleged theft with the possible involvement of the Chinese government. Their criminal trial started in October 2009. While prosecutors promised the jurors a "treasure trove" of evidence against the "traitors" and "spies", the defense stated the two just wanted to start their own company with their own ideas. After a month-long trial, a federal jury acquitted the two defendants on two counts and were leaning towards acquitting the two by a vote of 9–3 on two most serious counts of economic espionage. Jurors said the U.S. government failed to prove the NetLogic data was even a trade secret and much less aimed to benefit China. On October 27, 2010, after years of ordeal, the indictment against Lee and Ge was dismissed in its entirety by U.S. District Judge James Ware. During jury selection, the U.S. government attempted to remove the sole Chinese-American juror, named Yuqiang, but the defense successfully argued that he was targeted because of his racial background.

Wen Ho Lee 
Wen Ho Lee is a Taiwanese-American scientist who worked for the University of California at the Los Alamos National Laboratory. He created simulations of nuclear explosions for the purpose of scientific inquiry and to improve the safety and reliability of the U.S. nuclear arsenal. In December 1999, a federal grand jury indicted him of stealing secrets about the arsenal for China.

After federal investigators could not prove the initial accusations, the government conducted a separate investigation. It could only charge Lee with improper handling of restricted data, part of the original 59-count indictment to which he pleaded guilty as part of a plea bargain. In June 2006, Lee received $1.6 million from the federal government and five media organizations as partial settlement of a civil suit he filed against them for leaking his name to the press before charges were filed against him. At the conclusion of the case, presiding federal judge James Aubrey Parker stated that he was misled "by the executive branch of our government through its Department of Justice, by its Federal Bureau of Investigation and by its United States attorney". The judge stated that while he couldn't speak on behalf of the executive branch "I sincerely apologize to you, Dr. Lee, for the unfair manner you were held in custody by the executive branch."

Katrina Leung 
In 1982, FBI special agent James Smith recruited Katrina Leung, a 28-year-old Chinese immigrant, to work in Chinese counterintelligence. Leung, a prominent business consultant, was valued for her contacts with high-level Chinese officials, reporting back to the FBI's top Chinese-speaking counter-intelligence agents in California: James Smith and William Cleveland.  Smith and Leung became involved in a sexual relationship starting shortly after he recruited her, lasting nearly two decades.  Cleveland also became sexually involved with Leung from 1987, lasting around 15 years. Leung was codenamed Bureau Source 410, otherwise known as Parlor Maid, and was paid a total of $1.7m, while travelling repeatedly to China and later discovered to have 16 foreign bank accounts.
At this time, Smith made classified documents available to Leung; she copied them, providing China with information on nuclear, military, and political issues.  In December 1990, the National Security Agency (NSA) intercepted a telephone conversation in Chinese between a woman in Los Angeles and her Chinese handler in Beijing, whose name was Mao Guoha. She revealed to him, among other things, that William Cleveland was about to make a trip to China. The NSA passed the intercept on to the FBI who passed it to William Cleveland, who recognized the woman's voice as Katrina Leung's.  James Smith made the same discovery separately.  Both men covered it up for the next 12 years whilst maintaining their sexual relationships with Parlor Maid, apparently without either knowing of the other's.
When she was eventually exposed, the result was either: on January 6, 2005, U.S. District Judge Florence Marie Cooper dismissed Leung's case on the grounds of prosecutorial misconduct; or that "the FBI's lawyers bungled the prosecution and she was given so nominal a penalty that she exclaimed in court, 'I love America!'"

Xiaoxing Xi
In May 2015, the United States Department of Justice accused Temple University professor Xiaoxing Xi of sending restricted American technology to China, specifically, the design of a pocket heater used in superconductor research. Xi was arrested by about a dozen FBI agents at his home, and faced charges carrying a maximum penalty of 80 years in prison and a $1 million fine. In September 2015, however, the DOJ dropped all charges against him after leading scientists, including a co-inventor of the pocket heater, provided affidavits that the schematics that Xi shared with Chinese scientists were not restricted technology, and not for a pocket heater. According to Xi's lawyer Peter Zeidenberg, the government did not understand the complicated science and failed to consult with experts before arresting him. He said that the information Xi shared, as part of "typical academic collaboration", was about a different device, which Xi co-invented and is not restricted technology.
Xi has since sued the FBI, accusing the latter of falsifying evidence against him.

See also 
 Chinese intelligence operations in the United States
 American espionage in China 
 Hostage diplomacy

References 

Politics-related lists
United States crime-related lists
China–United States relations
Chinese spies
Espionage in the United States